Oleg Ishutkin (born July 22, 1975) is a retired male race walker from Russia. He represented his native country at the 1997 World Championships in Athletics and just missed out on a medal, finishing fourth in the men's 50 km race. Among his other achievements was a silver medal from the 50 km walk at the 1997 IAAF World Race Walking Cup.

International competitions

References

1975 births
Living people
Russian male racewalkers
Russian Athletics Championships winners